General Gibson may refer to:

George Gibson (Commissary General) (1775–1861), U.S. Army brevet major general, and the first Commissary General of Subsistence
John Gibson (American soldier) (1740–1822), Allegheny County Militia major general in various military engagements
Randall L. Gibson (1832–1892), Confederate States Army brigadier general

See also
Attorney General Gibson (disambiguation)